Jeremiah is a Belgian science fiction comic book series by Hermann Huppen. Jeremiah was created in 1979 for the German magazine Zack, and had a premiere in Sarajevo based Strip art magazine, since the editor of this magazine, Ervin Rustemagic, was also Hermann's manager. It has also been serialized in the French-language Métal Hurlant and Spirou magazine, as well as the Serbian magazines Stripoteka and Politikin Zabavnik. Currently, there are 34 volumes and one "Special Edition" in French and Dutch.

Plot
Racial wars have torn the U.S. apart, resulting in a post-apocalyptic world. Many small pockets of civilization still exist; from isolated super high-tech fortresses, hidden research labs, or racial groups in walled-in cities — all fighting each other among the more regular population which in many ways resembles the "old west".

Jeremiah and his friend Kurdy travel the country, taking odd jobs and getting mixed up in various affairs. Jeremiah, being the more noble of the two, often sticks his neck out to help others, while Kurdy is a more wily, opportunistic scoundrel.

Despite its setting, Jeremiah's underlying motif is of hope and the survival of mankind. The storylines carry little from album to album, meaning they can be read individually.

Reception
Jeremiah has been translated into 26 languages, and has a large fan base in Europe. Tome #25, Et si un jour la Terre, was nominated for the 2005 Angoulême International Comics Festival Prize Awarded by the Audience.

Various attempts to introduce the series to the American market have had middling results, mostly due to the different tastes of the American and European comic book public. The current holder of the English language copyrights is Strip Art Features (SAF). After failing to reach American audiences in the 1980s and 1990s with such publishers as Fantagraphics, Catalan Communications, and Malibu Comics; Jeremiah (and SAF) found success with Dark Horse beginning in the 2000s. In March 2012, Dark Horse Comics began another English language reprint series in collaboration with SAF; three volumes of the Jeremiah Omnibus, collecting tomes 1 to 3, 4 to 6, and 7 to 9 respectively, have been released as of October 2017. In May 2019, SAF released digital editions of volumes 1 to 6, and later of volumes 7 to 9 in July 2020.

List of titles 
Following are the Jeremiah comic albums as named in French, with publication dates.

English language Jeremiah comics

Television series

An American television series, Jeremiah, was produced from 2002–2004. Developed by Babylon 5 creator J. Michael Straczynski and executive produced by Straczynski and Sam Egan, the series is loosely based on the Jeremiah comics series. Aside from the names of the two main characters, the general personality of the protagonist, and the post-apocalyptic setting, there are no similarities between the comics and the series.

See also 
 Hombre (comics)

References

External links
 Hermann Huppen official site
 Dark Horse profile
 Jeremiah series at Dupuis Editions

Belgian comic strips
Métal Hurlant titles
Dark Horse Comics titles
Belgian comics characters
Drama comics
Post-apocalyptic comics
Dupuis titles
Science fiction comics
Fictional American people
1979 comics debuts
Comics characters introduced in 1979
Male characters in comics
Comics adapted into television series